The Under Secretary for Research, Education, and Economics is a high-ranking official within the United States Department of Agriculture that provides leadership and oversight for the Agricultural Research Service, National Institute of Food and Agriculture, Economic Research Service, National Agricultural Library, National Agricultural Statistics Service.

The Research, Education, and Economics (REE) mission area of the U. S. Department of Agriculture has federal leadership responsibility for advancing scientific knowledge related to agriculture through research, extension, and education.

REE delivers the scientific discovery mission of USDA through: 
 The Agricultural Research Service (ARS) is the largest intramural research agency of USDA. ARS has a workforce of around 8,000 employees, including 2,500 life and physical scientists who represent a wide range of disciplines and who work at more than 100 locations across the country and at five overseas laboratories. The ARS research agenda is broad, with about 1,200 research projects organized under 4 major program areas: Nutrition, Food Safety and Food Quality; Animal Production and Protection; Natural Resources and Sustainable Agricultural Systems; and Crop Production and Protection. 
 The National Institute of Food and Agriculture (NIFA) is USDA's primary extramural research funding agency. Its mission is to advance knowledge for agriculture, the environment, and human health and wellbeing by funding targeted research, education, and extension projects and programs, some of which are specific to the Land-Grant University System, others open to participation by other partner organizations. 
 The Economic Research Service (ERS) is USDA's primary source of economic information and economic and social science research. ERS’ mission is to anticipate economic and policy issues related to food, agriculture, the environment, and rural development, and conduct research that guides public program and policy decisions. 
 The National Agricultural Statistics Service (NASS) is committed to providing timely, accurate, and useful statistics in service to U.S. agriculture. Its reports cover virtually every aspect of U.S. agriculture, including production and supplies of food and fiber, prices paid and received by farmers, farm labor and wages, farm finances, chemical use, and changes in the demographics of U.S. producers.

Officeholders

November 2019 - :  Dr. Scott Hutchins is the Deputy Under Secretary for Research, Education, and Economics and acting Under Secretary for Research, Education, and Economics. A Senate Agriculture Committee hearing about his nomination by President Donald Trump was held November 28th 2018 and on May 14, 2019, there was unanimous consent for this nomination. Prior to this appointment he held several senior posts at Dow AgroSciences. He is an entomologist, Professor of entomology at the University of Nebraska-Lincoln and past President of the Entomological Society of America. 

January 2017 - November 2018: The position became vacant at the end of the Obama administration. On July 19, 2017, President Donald Trump announced his intent to nominate Sam Clovis of Iowa for the position. At the time, Clovis was Senior White House Advisor to the Department of Agriculture and was formerly chief policy advisor and national co-chair of the Trump-Pence campaign. According to Ricardo Salvador, Food and Environment Program Director for the science advocacy group Union of Concerned Scientists, Clovis lacked the traditional technological and scientific background of the post and was a self-proclaimed climate change skeptic. Clovis withdrew his nomination on November 2, 2017.
 
September 16, 2010 - December 2016: Dr. Catherine Woteki was Under Secretary, as well as the Department's Chief Scientist, after she was confirmed by the U.S. Senate on September 16, 2010, until December 2016. She was USDA's first Under Secretary for Food Safety from 1997 to 2001. With a background in human nutrition, she had previously worked in industry and academia and was Global Director of Scientific Affairs for Mars, Incorporated as well as Dean of Agriculture and Professor of Human Nutrition at Iowa State University from 2002- 2005. Her scientific career had started after taking a bachelor's degree in Biology and Chemistry from Mary Washington College (1969) followed by Masters and Ph.D. degrees in Human Nutrition from Virginia Polytechnic Institute and State University in 1974.

September 2010 - ? Ann Bartuska was Deputy Under Secretary for Research, Education, and Economics in USDA as well as Chief Scientist. 

2009-10 Molly Jahn was Acting Under Secretary of Research, Education and Economics, USDA.

2006 - 2009: Gale Buchanan was Under Secretary for Research, Education, and Economics, USDA, and Chief Scientist.  He had been Dean and Director, College of Agricultural and Environmental Sciences, University of Georgia prior to this appointment.

2001 - 2006: Joseph (Joe) Jen was Under Secretary for Research, Education, and Economics during the presidency of George W Bush. Jen had taken a bachelor's degree in agriculture chemistry, master's in food science and a doctorate in biochemistry. He had been Dean of Agriculture from 1992 to 2001 at Cal Poly. Prior to this, he had been Director of Research between 1980 and 1986 for the Campbell Institute of Science and Technology, a division of Campbell Soup Co.

May 23 1995 - : Karl N. Stauber, selected by President Clinton, was confirmed by the US Senate as Under Secretary of Agriculture for Research, Education, and Economics on May 23 1995. He had been Acting Deputy Under Secretary of Agriculture for Research, Education, and Economics since December 1994.

Appointees who have resigned

References